The 2006–07 Duke Blue Devils men's basketball team represented Duke University. The head coach was Mike Krzyzewski, serving for his 27th year. The team played its home games in Cameron Indoor Stadium in Durham, North Carolina.

Recruiting

Roster

Schedule

|-
!colspan=9 style=| Regular Season

|-
!colspan=12 style=| ACC Tournament

|-
!colspan=12 style=| NCAA tournament

References 

Duke Blue Devils
Duke Blue Devils men's basketball seasons
Duke
Duke
Duke